Bio F.R.E.A.K.S. is a 3D fighting video game released by Midway in 1998. It was originally planned for arcades. Prototypes of the game were tested at arcades, but the final arcade release was canceled (although a ROM image of the prototype was eventually dumped and works in MAME) and the game was later released for the PlayStation, Nintendo 64 and Microsoft Windows.

Plot
In the not-too-distant future, the United States fell like all great empires throughout history. Fifty states were broken into private territories after the Techno-Industrial Civil Wars. Technology and bio-engineering accelerated at an incredible rate, and forced an industrial competition of corporate espionage. The government tried to keep control of the country by a single thread, but the effect of the giant corporations' white collar wars drove the economy into a tailspin. Neo-Amerika rises as the result of the government bankruptcy and technological companies' takeover. To maintain order, the Secret Games Commission (SGC) is formed to organize tournaments deciding which organization gets to control all of Neo-Amerika, leading to the creation of Biological Flying Robotic Enhanced Armored Killing Synthoids (Bio F.R.E.A.K.S.) serving as the champions for each participating organization.

Gameplay

The game uses a fully polygonal fighting engine, with 8 different fighters, and 2 boss fighters.

Bio F.R.E.A.K.S. uses a mix of hand-to-hand and long range combat. Each character has an assortment of special attacks, both close and long range, as well as "finishing attacks". Much like the Fatalities of the Mortal Kombat games, these moves can execute the player's opponents while some, like in Time Killers, will remove limbs. Damage from powerful attacks can add up, causing a limb to be destroyed as well.

The game takes place in 3D fighting arenas. Emphasis was placed on mobility, giving dashes a great range and in multiple directions.

The face buttons are assigned to specific limbs. The shoulder buttons are used for dodging, flying, and basic long range attacks.

Reception

The Nintendo and PlayStation versions received mixed or average reviews according to the review aggregation website GameRankings.

Notes

References

External links
 
 

1998 video games
3D fighting games
Cancelled arcade video games
Fighting games
Midway video games
Mortal Kombat clones
Multiplayer and single-player video games
Multiplayer video games
Nintendo 64 games
PlayStation (console) games
Saffire games
Video games about death games
Video games developed in the United States
Video games scored by Aubrey Hodges
Windows games
Video games set in the United States
Video games set in the future